John II ( – 19 May 1381) was a Franco-Dutch nobleman who ruled lands in both France and the Holy Roman Empire. He was the count of Blois and Dunois from 1372 until 1381, the lord of Avesnes, Schoonhoven, Gouda, Beaumont, Chimay and Waarde from 1356 until 1381 and the stadtholder of Holland and Zeeland in 1359–1360 and 1362–1363 during the absences of Count Albert of Bavaria. He was also a claimant jure uxoris to the Duchy of Guelders from 1372 until 1379.

John was the second son of Count Louis II of Blois and Jeanne of Hainault, daughter of John of Beaumont. His father died at the battle of Crécy in 1346 and his mother administered his inheritance. In 1356, his maternal grandfather died, leaving him many lordships scattered throughout the Low Countries.

John made his chief residence at Schoonhoven, where he patronized French and Dutch poets. His court was the literary centre of Holland before the arrival of Albert of Bavaria. John was on good terms with Albert and represented him during his absence from Holland. In 1362 and 1363, when John went on crusade in Prussia, he took with him his professional storyteller, Augustijnken.

On 14 February 1372, John married Matilda, daughter of Duke Reginald II of Guelders. That same year, he succeeded his elder brother, Louis III, in the counties of Blois and Dunois.

In 1371, Matilda's brothers, Dukes Reginald III and Edward, had died. John spent most of the rest of his life trying to seize Guelders from Matilda's nephew, William VII of Jülich, in the First War of the Guelderian Succession. William had the support of the Emperor Charles IV. In 1377, John was forced to abandon Arnhem, where he had set up his court. In 1379, he renounced his claim on Guelders in exchange for an annual pension from William.

John died at Valenciennes. He had no children with his wife. He had two sons by a mistress, Isabeau d'Isbergues: John, who became lord of Trélon, and Guy, lord of Heften in Zeeland.

Notes

Bibliography

 

1340s births
1381 deaths
Counts of Blois
Christians of the Prussian Crusade
14th century in the Netherlands
House of Châtillon